Macrothyatira fasciata is a moth in the family Drepanidae. It was first described by Constant Vincent Houlbert in 1921. It is found in the following areas of China: Beijing, Shanxi, Henan, Shaanxi, Hubei, Sichuan, Yunnan and Tibet.

References

Moths described in 1921
Thyatirinae
Moths of Asia